Bishop Arkadiusz Trochanowski (born 6 January 1973) is a Polish Ukrainian Greek Catholic hierarch as the first eparchial bishop of the newly created Ukrainian Catholic Eparchy of Olsztyn–Gdańsk since 25 November 2020.

Early life and education
Bishop-elect Trochanowski was born into the Greek-Catholic family of Jan and Olga Trochanowski in the Lubusz Voivodeship. His parents were forcibly resettled with another Ukrainians in Poland, from ethnical Ukrainian territories to the Recovered Territories in the western Poland during Operation Vistula in the 1947 and were actively involved in the parochial life. After graduation of the school education in his native Szprotawa, he joined the Major Theological Seminary in Lublin, simultaneously studying in the John Paul II Catholic University of Lublin (1994–2000). He also undertook specialist studies at the Pontifical Faculty of Theology at the University of Wrocław with a licentiate degree, and in 2012 he obtained the title of the Doctor of Theology in ecumenism at the Faculty of Theology of the University of Adam Mickiewicz in Poznań.

Pastoral work
He was ordained as priest on 29 July 2000 in Wrocław for the Ukrainian Catholic Eparchy of Wrocław-Gdańsk by eparchial bishop Włodzimierz Juszczak and immediately was appointed as an assistant priest to the parishes of Wrocław, Środa Śląska, Oława and Oleśnica (2000–2001)

In 2001, Fr. Trochanowski became the parish priest in Wałcz, where served until 2020 and during 2001–2016 he was also the parish priest in Szczecinek. In the same time he became a member of the priestly council of the Eparchy (2006–2020), a dean of Koszalin deanery (2010–2020) and a Chairman of the Eparchial Commission for children and youth (2006–2020).

Bishop
On 25 November 2020, with the creation of the new ecclesiastical circumscription in Poland, Fr. Trochanowski was appointed by Pope Francis as the first Eparchial Bishop of the Ukrainian Catholic Eparchy of Olsztyn–Gdańsk.

His consecration to the episcopate took place on 23 January 2021 in the Protection of the Mother of God Cathedral in Olsztyn. The principal consecrator was Major Archbishop Sviatoslav Shevchuk, the Head of the Ukrainian Greek Catholic Church with other hierarchs of the Ukrainian Greek Catholic Church.

References

1973 births
Living people
People from Szprotawa
John Paul II Catholic University of Lublin alumni
University of Wrocław alumni
Adam Mickiewicz University in Poznań alumni
Polish Eastern Catholics
Bishops of the Ukrainian Greek Catholic Church
Polish people of Ukrainian descent
Bishops in Poland
Bishops appointed by Pope Francis